The Society of Gynecologic Nurse Oncologists (SGNO) is an international organization made up of nurses and other health professionals in the field of gynecologic oncology and women's health care.

Mission
The society is dedicated to the advancement of patient care, education, and research in gynecologic oncology and women's health care.

History

In 1980, a group of ten US and Canadian nurses met in Scottsdale, AZ with a goal to form a gynecologic oncology nurses society.  These ten nurses became the founding council of the SGNO:
Cynthia Beebe
Terry Chamorro
Lynda Ronan-Conan
Mary Lou Cullen
Terre Currie
Diana Hoff
Judith Hubbard	
Sharon Kelly
Paula Major	
Helen Peterson

Presidents

1984-1988	Lynda Ronan-Cowen
1988-1992	Judy Dean-Hubbard
1992-1994	Beth Colvin-Huff
1994-1996	Lois Almadrones
1996-1998	Lois Winkleman
1998-2000	Sheryl Redlin-Frazier
2000-2002	Suzy Lockwood
2002-2004	Alice Spinelli
2004-2006	Susan Temple
2006-2008	Susan McIntyre
2008-2010	Susan Coples
2010-2012	Lynn Cloutier
2012-2014      Vicky Willis

Annual symposium
In July 1983, the first SGNO educational conference was held in Denver, CO.  75 nurses from the US and Canada attended the conference. Since then, the Society has hosted an annual educational symposium that concentrates on the care of women with gynecologic cancers and overall women’s health.

SGNO publications
Contemporary Issues in Women's Cancers - reference book
Women and Cancer - textbook
The Journal of Gynecologic Oncology Nursing - the Society's official peer-reviewed journal that is indexed in the Cumulative Index to Nursing and Allied Health Literature.

References

External links 
 http://www.sgno.org/
 http://www.sgno.org/publications/journal/

Nursing organizations
Obstetrics and gynaecology organizations